Rossiteria pseudonucleolus is a species of sea snail, a marine gastropod mollusk in the family Trochidae, the top snails.

Description
The size of the shell varies between 4.2 mm and 11.5 mm.

Distribution
This marine species occurs off the Philippines.

References

External links
 

pseudonucleolus
Gastropods described in 2006